Kazakhstan participated in the 2010 Winter Olympics in Vancouver, British Columbia, Canada.

Medalists

Alpine skiing

Biathlon

Men

Women

Cross-country skiing

Men

Women

Sprint

Figure skating

Freestyle skiing

Short track speed skating

Ski jumping

Speed skating

See also
 Kazakhstan at the Olympics
 Kazakhstan at the 2010 Winter Paralympics

References 

2010 in Kazakhstani sport
Nations at the 2010 Winter Olympics
2010